The 2023 SAFF U-20 Women's Championship was the 4th edition of the SAFF U-18/19/20 Women's Championship, an international football competition for women's under–20 national teams organized by SAFF. The tournament were played from 3–9 February 2023 in Bangladesh.
 
Bangladesh is the defending champion having defeated Nepal by 3–0 goals in the final of the tournament on 9 February 2023.

Venue
All matches were held at the BSSS Mostafa Kamal Stadium in Dhaka, Bangladesh.

Participating nations

Players eligibility
Players born on or after 1 January 2003 are eligible to compete in the tournament. Each team has to register a squad of minimum 16 players and maximum 23 players, minimum two of whom must be goalkeepers.

Match officials
Referees

 Maya Lado
 Kusum Mandi
 Jaya Chakma
 Yangkhey Tshering

Assistant referees
 
 Salma Akter Mone
 Merina Dhimal
 Chim Chim Serto
 Prem Kumari Sunwar

Round robin

Tiebreakers
Teams are ranked according to points (3 points for a win, 1 point for a draw, 0 points for a loss), and if tied on points, the following tie-breaking criteria are applied, in the order given, to determine the rankings.
Points in head-to-head matches among tied teams;
Goal difference in head-to-head matches among tied teams;
Goals scored in head-to-head matches among tied teams;
If more than two teams are tied, and after applying all head-to-head criteria above, a subset of teams are still tied, all head-to-head criteria above are reapplied exclusively to this subset of teams;
Goal difference in all group matches;
Goals scored in all group matches;
Penalty shoot-out if only two teams are tied and they met in the last round of the group;
Disciplinary points (yellow card = 1 point, red card as a result of two yellow cards = 3 points, direct red card = 3 points, yellow card followed by direct red card = 4 points);
Drawing of lots.

Standings

Matches

Final

Winners

Awards
The following awards were given at the conclusion of the tournament:

Statistics

Goalscorers

4 Goals
  Shamsunnahar Junior
  Amisha Karki

3 Goals
  Shaheda Akter Ripa
  Most Aklima Khatun
  Anita Kumari
  Lynda Kom
  Neha
  Apurna Narzary

2 Goals
  Preeti Rai

1 Goal
  Unnoti Khatun
  Nitu Linda
  Manmaya Damai
  Anjali Chand

Hat-tricks

See also
2023 SAFF U-17 Women's Championship
2023 SAFF Championship
2023 SAFF U-19 Championship
2023 SAFF U-16 Championship

References

2022
2022 in women's association football
2022 in Asian football
2022 in youth association football
March 2022 sports events in India